Deioces, from the Aryan-Median Dahyu-ka-, meaning "the lands" (above, on and beneath the earth), was the founder and the first King of Median Empire as well as priest of the Median Empire. His name has been mentioned in different forms in various sources, including the Ancient Greek historian Herodotus, who has written his name as Δηιόκης (Dēiokēs).

The exact date of the era of Deioces' rule is not clear and probably covered most of the first half of the seventh century BC. According to Herodotus, Deioces governed for 53 years. Some Iranologists consider Deioces the same as Hushang in Shahnameh due to the features Herodotus states for the former and believe the title Paradat or Pishdadian equal to "the first legislator". The religious tradition considers Hushang the first person to found kingship in Iran.

Biography
Based on Herodotus's writings, Deioces was the first Median king to have gained independence from the Neo-Assyrian Empire. He contemplated the project and plan of forming a single Median government; and in an anarchistic era of the Medes, he tried to enforce justice in his own village and earn a credibility and fame as a neutral judge. Thus, the territory of his activity was expanded and the peoples of other villages also resorted to him until he eventually announced that this place has been troublesome for him and he is not willing to continue working. Following this resignation, theft and chaos increased and the Medians gathered and chose him as the king this time.

Deioces' first action after coronation was to appoint guards for himself and also constructing a capital. The city Deioces chose for it was called Hagmatāna in Old Persian and Ecbatana in the Ancient Greek language, believed to be Hamadan today. Ecbatana means "the gathering place" or "a city for everyone" and indicates the gathering of the Median clans, which were disunited previously. In the late eighth century BC, he had a fortified castle constructed on a hill in the city to run all military, government, and treasury affairs within. In 715 BC, Sargon II, the Assyrian king, learned that Deioces had allied with Rusa I, the Urartian king. He started watching Deioces and during his war with the Mannaeans, he entered the Medes again so as to end its "anarchy", as he claimed. He finally captured Deioces and exiled him along with his family to Hama (in Syria today).

After Deioces, his son, Phraortes, succeeded him and ruled for 22 years; though some researchers believe that he ruled for fifty-three years (678-625 BC). During his reign, he conquered Persia and went to war with other peoples of the Iranian Plateau. He invaded Assyria; during these attacks, the Medians were defeated and Phraortes was killed in the war.

Foundation of the Median kingdom 

In the ancient times, the Medes was bounded by the Aras river and the Alborz mountains to the north, Dasht-e Kavir to the east and the Zagros mountains to the west and south. What is learned from the Assyrian texts is that from the ninth to seventh century BC, the Medians had not been able to thrive enough to cause the convergence and alliance and organization of the scattered Median tribes and clans around a superior and single leader and lord who could be called the king of all the Median lands. During their several invasions on the Median settled territories, the Assyrian kings always encountered a large number of "local shahs" and not a single king ruling all of the Median lands. After the death of Sargon II in 705 BC, the Assyrians diverted their attention to another spot far from Iran. The opportunity, along with the everlasting fear of the Assyrian invasion, caused the formation of a union of Median princes and monarchs. The leaders of the movement were Deioces' followers.

Based on Herodotus's writings, Deioces was the one who contemplated the idea and plan of forming a single Median government; the Medians lived in separate autonomous villages or small cities. In an anarchistic era in the Medes, Deioces tried to enforce justice in his own village and gained a credit and reputation as a neutral judge; thus the territory of his activities expanded; and the peoples of other villages resorted to him until he eventually announced that the requests of the people are too much and the post is troublesome and difficult for him and he is not ready to continue the work. Following the resignation, theft and chaos increased; and the Medians gathered and chose him as the king in order to settle the disagreements. Assyrian sources mention an independent Median kingdom in 673 BC. for the first time.

Probably imitating the Assyrians, Deioces held a ceremony for the first time; Herodotus states that Deioces stayed in his palace; and his connection was by sending to and receiving messages from the outside; and no one was able to contact the king directly; and the petitions and messages were performed only by the messengers; the limitation was in order to make a sense of fear and respect among the people. Besides, it was forbidden to laugh or expectorate in the king's presence. Of his other actions was creating a group called "The King's Eyes and Ears", which consisted of people assigned to spy for the king himself; this organization and group existed until the Achaemenid era.

Diakonoff believes that Deioces could not have been the king of the whole Medes, and was not even the ruler of a large region, and was just one of the small and numerous Median lords; but the illustrious history of the successors shined on his face and gave him fame in history. In the beginning, Deioces made a wise move and placed his weak and small and new government under the support of Mannae, which was so powerful then, but later struggled to become completely independent, and thus made an alliance with Urartu. The Assyrian sources also call Deioces "a ruler from Mannae" in the events of 715 BC.

Ecbatana 

After coronation, Deioces' first action was to appoint guards for himself and also construct a capital. The city which Deioces chose for it was called Hagmatāna in Old Persian and Ecbatana in Greek language, considered to be Hamadan today. Ecbatana means "the gathering place" or "a city for everyone" and indicates the gathering of Median clans, which had been disunited before. In the late eighth century BC, he had a fortified castle constructed on a hill in the city to run all the military, government and treasury affairs within. Herodotus describes that the royal complex was made of seven concentric walls, with each internal one higher than the external one. Each of the seven walls were decorated with a specific color: the first (external) wall was white, second wall black, third one high red, fourth blue, fifth low red, sixth wall copper, and the seventh and innermost wall gold. Such a coloring was the symbol of the seven planets in Babylon, but was an imitation of Babylon in Ecbatana. The king's palace was situated within the last wall along with its treasures. However, this narrative of Herodotus's is not corroborated by what is written in Assyrian sources, which imply the existence of various masters in the Medes until years after Deioces, and the foundation of an independent royal body and constructing several large royal complexes was not something that the Assyrians could easily remain silent against; thus these words from Herodotus seem exaggerative, or depict an adapted and modified picture of the periods after Deioces' reign. Nevertheless, Polybius, a famous Greek historian, has mentioned this palace in his book and description of Hamadan, stating the long age of this palace.

According to some historians and archaeologists, the hill that is currently situated in the city and known as the Ecbatana Hill, was the true place of the ancient city of Ecbatana.

Some historians, including Henry Rawlinson, believe that the Ecbatana mentioned in Herodotus's writings is not the current Hamadan; and the olden Median capital should be searched in Takht-e Soleymān and in the vicinity of Lake Urmia to the south east. But some researchers, like Jacques de Morgan, believe that Herodotus's Ecbatana is the same Hamadan today; and the places of the seven castles of Fort Ecbatana could be identified by the projections on the land and hills.

Etymology 
Deioces' name has been mentioned in various forms in different sources. The Greek historian Herodotus has stated his name as Δηϊόκης (Dēiokēs). In Assyrian texts, he has been mentioned as Da-a-a-uk-ku; and in Elamite ones, as Da-a-(hi-)(ú-)uk-ka and Da-a-ya-u(k)-ka.

Deioces' name is derived from the Iranian Dahyu-ka, and is the junior noun of the word dahyu-, meaning "the land". The old Iranian name Deioces was not uncommon even in later times. In the Achaemenid period, the Old Persian form of Deioces has been mentioned in several Elamite inscriptions of the mud plates of Persepolis. Those mentions apparently referred to different persons in separate government regions; and one of them was an individual assigned to the food rationing of the horses.

Friedrich von Spiegel believes that Dahayuku means "resident and headman of the village" and is in fact the older form of the word dehghan "farmer". Also following Spiegel's theory, Ferdinand Justi believes that Deioces' name is his title and a shortened form of dahyaupati in Old Persian and danhupaiti in Avestan having acquired the suffix -ka.

Dates of Reign
The era of Deioces' reign is subject to controversy. Herodotus says that Deioces ruled for 53 years and thus some assumptions have been made about the era of his reign; but it seems that Herodotus's report is based on a verbal narrative. Based on Herodotus's report, the researchers have concluded that Deioces was the founder of the Median empire and also the first Median king having gained independence from the Assyrians. But Herodotus's report is a mixture of Greek and Oriental legends and is not historically reliable. Also, it is assumed that the Median king whom Herodotus's reports are about is the same Deioces, Phraortes' father; thus, it is not possible to clarify the exact date of the period of his rule; but it can be said that it probably covered most of the first half of the 7th century BC Igor Diakonoff says: "The state of the era of Deioces' reign in Herodotus's writings is so different from the picture of that time (745-675 BC) described by the Assyrian sources that some historians have rejected Herodotus's statement."

Encyclopædia Iranica mentions the foundation of the Medes in 708 BC centered in Ecbatana and by Deioces.

In Assyrian sources, 674 BC, there are mentions of the actions of a person called Kashthrita, whom some researchers believe to be the same Phraortes. Therefore, the year 674 BC can be considered the end of Deioces' rule; and by reckoning his fifty-three-year old reign, the beginning of the era of Deioces' rule should be around 728 BC. Below is a list of the era of Deioces' reign based on the historians' views:

Therefore, we should search for confirmations of Cuneiform sources; and actually previously in 1869, George Smith realized that in the Neo-Assyrian texts in the period of the reign of Sargon II (721 to 705 BC), a person called Deioces is mentioned several times. In the calendar of the eighth year of this king's reign (i.e. 715 BC) and in the so-called Khersabad demonstrative inscription, Deioces is named as the governor of one of the provinces of Mannae, having somewhat independently ruled a region bordering the kingdoms of Assyria and Mannae. The exact position of his domain is not clear, but has probably been situated in the Zarrin Rud Valley. Deioces, whose son was captured by the Urartians, supported the king of Urartu, Rusa I, against the ruler of Mannae, Ullusunu, but eventually failed for Sargon intervened in the affair and finally captured Deioces and exiled him along with his family to Hama (in Syria today). Deioces was probably involved in a rebellion against the Mannaean king, Iranzu, the preceding year for one of the governors listed in the Assyrian calendar the same year is not named; and he was probably the very Deioces; though the validity of the matter cannot be authenticated with certainty.

Deioces in narrative Iranian history 
Some Iranologists believe Deioces to be the Hushang in Shahnameh due to the features Herodotus states for him and consider the title "Paradat" or "Pishdadian" equal to "the first legislator". The religious tradition considers Hushang the first person to establish kingship in Iran.

Among Herodotus's reports about Deioces and those of Avesta and Middle Persian, Arabic and New Persian texts about Hushang, there are some common features about the identities of Hushang and Deioces; the most important of them can be summarized in three points:
 According to Herodotus, Deioces was the headman of the village during the time; and the name or title Deioces  meaning farmer must have been given to him because of this; and Hushang, according to Arabic and Persian texts, made innovations in agriculture; and thus he probably acquired the title farmer.
 Deioces and Hushang were the first legislator and the first king; and thus, Hushang was given the title Paradat or Pishdad or Bishdad and Fishdad (Arabic), which was probably an imitation of the name and title of the Assyrian king Sargon of Akkad, meaning "the lawful king".
 Deioces and Hushang developed housing and urban lifestyle and thus Hushang acquired the name or title Heoshingeh or Hushang or Ushhanj (Arabic).

References

Median kings
670s BC deaths
7th-century BC rulers in Asia
7th-century BC Iranian people
8th-century BC Iranian people
Median dynasty